WWSS (95.3 FM) is a radio station licensed to Tuscarora Township, Michigan, United States. The station airs a classic rock format and is currently owned by Black Diamond Broadcasting Holdings, LLC. The station previously aired a country music format before trading signals with Black Diamond Broadcasting classic rock station 97.7 WCHY, with WCHY becoming Straits Country's new signal on March 12, 2018. It is part of a simulcast with 98.1 WGFN.

References

External links

WSS
Classic rock radio stations in the United States
Radio stations established in 2012
2012 establishments in Michigan